Your Neighbor's Son: The Making of a Torturer ( or ) is a documentary or docudrama directed by Jørgen Flindt Pedersen and Erik Stephensen in two versions, 1976 and 1981. The film documents the conversion of young  Greek Military Police (ESA) recruits into torturers and touches on the subject of the power of the institution to compel otherwise moral human beings to torture. The documentary examines the processes and methods of the military junta that ruled Greece from 1967 to 1974.

Plot
The documentary dramatizes the recruiting and training of a number of young men into the Greek police force during the military junta rule. A number of otherwise decent young men are selected based on a number of traits viewed as exploitable by the recruiters: illiterate, anti-communist, young and male, drawing comparisons to the Cambodian torturers at Tuol Sleng, many of whom were under 19 years old.

The film also interviews Michalis Petrou, a conscript who served in the Military Police and was trained to become one of the most notorious torturers of the EAT-ESA. Petrou's testimony reveals that the training methods on themselves were brutal and often torturous and was viewed as a necessity to ensure the robotic and brutal obedience of the trainees. According to him, during that period, he was capable for any torture method, if he was ordered.

During the dramatic recreation of the training camps, the directors draw parallels to modern military recruit trainings and the methods used in the training of soldiers.

Response
The New York Times columnist Lawrence Van Gelder noted that while the film was technically flawed it was at the same time "memorable and unnerving" in its depiction of both the victims of the torture as well as the ordeals of the torturers themselves, and claimed "it is impossible to regard its torturers or its victims without realizing that the view may be a view into a mirror."

References

External links
Select Filmography on Human Rights
Your Neighbor's Son at IMDB
 in Danish and Greek with Danish subtitles.
1981 version on Vimeo in English and Greek with English subtitles.

1976 films
1981 films
Greek documentary films
Danish documentary films
Documentary films about crime
Documentary films about law enforcement
Police misconduct in Greece
Torture
Anti-communism in Greece
Works about the Greek junta
Documentary films about Greece
1976 documentary films
1981 documentary films